Purnima is a 1965 Indian family entertainment romance film produced by Mahipatray Shah and directed by Narendra Suri in Hindi language under the Roopkala Pictures company.

Cast
 Dharmendra as Prakash
 Meena Kumari as Purnima
 Mehmood as Chimanbhai 'Kafanwala' Suratwala
 Anita Guha as Vandana Mehra
 Nasir Hussain as Ratan Lal
 Durga Khote as Sharda R. Lal

Soundtrack

The soundtrack album of Purnima consists of 8 songs composed by Kalyanji-Anandji the lyrics of which were written by Bharat Vyas, Gulzar, Gulshan Bawra and Prakash Mehra.

Release

References

External links
 

1965 films
1960s Hindi-language films
1965 drama films
Indian black-and-white films